Mingxi County is a county of Sanming City, Fujian, People's Republic of China.

Area: .

Population: 110,000.

Postal Code: 365200.

The county government is located in Xuefeng town.

Administrative divisions
Towns:
Xuefeng, Gaiyang, Hufang, Hanxian

Townships:
Chengguan Township, Shaxi Township, Xiayang Township, Fengxi Township, Xiafang Township

Climate

References

External links
Official website of Mingxi County government

County-level divisions of Fujian
Sanming